Fall Into Me is the name of the fourth studio album of country music artist Katie Armiger. It was released January 15, 2013, via Cold River Records. The album's track listing was released December 10, 2012; and Armiger had her hand in writing all of the album's 14 songs.

Critical reception 
The album garnered mainly positive reviews. Most praised her transition to a more risky sound. Taste of Country's Billy Dukes described the album as "a rollercoaster ride that at times feels like that line from Taylor Swift‘s "We Are Never Ever Getting Back Together". Roughstock's Matt Bjorke described the album as "record of growth and change and about a woman asserting herself more than ever. The evolution of Katie Armiger is complete".
GAC's Daryl Addison said "it’s clear that Katie’s delivery is only getting better".

Singles 
The album's lead single, "Better in a Black Dress", was released on or about June 4, 2012. It peaked on Billboard's Hot Country Songs chart before the new chart methodology was enforced at number 45 in September. It peaked on the new Country Airplay chart at number 42 in November.

The album's second single, "Playin' with Fire", was released on February 11, 2013. The song peaked at number 50 on the Country Airplay chart in June 2013.

The album's third single, "Safe", was released January 20, 2014, in dedication to our nation's first responders.  As part of her "Project Feel Safe" campaign, Katie Armiger wants you to use the hashtag #projectfeelsafe to give thanks by sharing your messages of support, personal stories and photos on Facebook, Twitter and Instagram.  Together we can make sure those that sacrifice so much, sometimes their life, for our safety are not forgotten.

Track listing

Personnel

 Katie Armiger – handclapping, lead vocals, background vocals
 Robert Bailey – background vocals
 Nick Buda – drums
 Tom Bukovac – 12-string acoustic guitar, acoustic guitar, electric guitar
 Chad Carlson – bass guitar, dobro, acoustic guitar, electric guitar, keyboards, programming, background vocals
 Chad Cromwell – drums
 Eric Darken – cowbell, percussion, shaker, vibraphone
 Dan Dugmore – steel guitar, lap steel guitar
 Melissa Fuller – background vocals
 Kenny Greenberg – electric guitar, steel guitar
 Vicki Hampton – background vocals
 Matt Heasley – bandleader 
 Wes Hightower – background vocals
 Mallary Hope – background vocals
 Tim Lauer – accordion, clavinet, Fender Rhodes, harmonica, harmonium, mellotron, organ, piano, synthesizer
 Rachel Loy – bass guitar
 Mac McAnally – acoustic guitar
 Rob McNelley – electric guitar
 Megan Nicole – background vocals
 Jimmie Lee Sloas – bass guitar
 Ilya Toshinsky – banjo, bouzouki, dobro, 12-string guitar, acoustic guitar, resonator guitar, mandolin
 Jesse Tucker – acoustic guitar
 Bruce Wallace – background vocals
 Alex Wolaver – viola
 Annie Wolaver – violin
 Benjamin Wolaver – cello
 Bill Wolaver – string arrangements 
 Nir Z – drums, handclapping

Chart performance

Weekly charts

Year-end charts

Singles

References 

2013 albums
Katie Armiger albums